The 1956 United States Senate election in Indiana took place on November 6, 1956. Incumbent Republican U.S. Senator Homer Capehart was re-elected to a third term in office, defeating former U.S. Secretary of Agriculture Claude Wickard.

General election

Candidates
Homer Capehart, incumbent Senator since 1945 (Republican)
Gordon A. Long (Socialist Labor)
Carl W. Thompson (Prohibition)
Claude Wickard, former U.S. Secretary of Agriculture (1940–45) (Democratic)

Results

See also 
 1956 United States Senate elections

References

1956
Indiana
United States Senate